Leidsewallen is a RandstadRail station in Zoetermeer, the Netherlands.

History

The station opened, as a railway station, on 29 September 1979 as part of the Zoetermeerlijn, operating Zoetermeer Stadslijn services. The train station closed on 3 June 2006 and reopened as a RandstadRail station on 29 October 2007.  

The station features 2 platforms. These platforms are low, and the same level as the tram doors, therefore making it step free.

Train services
The following services currently call at Leidsewallen:

Gallery

Railway stations opened in 1979
RandstadRail stations in Zoetermeer